Yalding is a village and civil parish in the Borough of Maidstone in Kent, England. At the 2001 census, the parish, which includes the villages of Benover and Laddingford, had a population of 2,236. increasing to 2,418 at the 2011 Census.

 There are three bridges in the village; the Twyford Bridge (meaning twin ford, where there was originally a double crossing of the two rivers) is one of the finest medieval bridges in the south-east of England. Yalding was one of the principal shipment points on the River Medway for cannon, from villages of the Wealden iron industry. One iron master was John Browne from Horsmonden.
The wharf was later used for transporting fruit from the many orchards in the area.

History
The Saxon village was called Twyford and was close to the bridge. But the name was recorded in the Domesday Book as the Saxon manor of Hallinges seized by William the Conqueror and given to his half brother Odo of Bayeux, Yalding was derived from the Olde English pre 7th century "Ealdingas" and translates as the place of the Ealda people a tribe who were widespread until the 9 the century (the old village). It was recorded in the "Domesday" as "Hallinges" by a Norman-French cleric who had little knowledge of the area. In 1212 it is recorded more correctly as "Ealding" (ref; www.surnamedb.com/Surname/Yalden.ref; www.britannica.com Encyclopaedia-Britannica William 1st King of England. ref; Yalding surname meaning and statistics https://forebears.io ref Anglo-Saxon settlement of Britain. Wikipedia. Phonological history of English diphthongs. Wikipedia) By 1642 this had mutated to Yaldinge.

The medieval records from Yalding are so complete that it was used in a History Case Study for Secondary Schools, called The Yalding Project.

During the English Civil War in 1643, a battle took place at Town Bridge between the Roundheads and Cavaliers. The Cavaliers had advanced from Aylesford towards Tonbridge, but the Parliamentarian soldiers had marched to block their movements, bombarded them and forced their surrender, with the result that 300 were captured and 300 escaped.

Yalding was a favourite of Edith Nesbit, author of The Railway Children, who wrote in the 1920s: "The Medway just above the Anchor (at Yalding, Kent) is a river of dreams...If you go to Yalding you may stay at the George and be comfortable in a little village that owns a haunted churchyard, a fine church, and one of the most beautiful bridges in Europe."

The village was home to a chemicals manufacturing works from 1912 to 2003. In the early years it manufactured soap, then progressed to crop protection products under Imperial Chemical Industries' Agrochemicals Division. It was run by Syngenta at the time of closure.

Garden Organic, previously known as the Henry Doubleday Research Association, the UK's leading organic growing charity, created a demonstration garden near the village. This was closed in 2007 but was leased and reopened by the business Maro Foods, in 2008. The gardens are now known as the Yalding Gardens.

Buildings
St Peter's and St Paul's church is a Grade I listed building. It is built from ragstone, and is judged to be from the 13th century. The tower turret has a weather vane dated 1734.

Yalding Baptist Church is a Baptist church located on Vicarage Road.

Rivers
Twyford Bridge crosses the River Medway. It is just downstream of the automatic sluice where the river drops from +11.2m to +7.41m above mean sea level, the navigation bears left through the Hampstead Rd Canal, and the Hampstead Lock, the main stream drops over the weir and sluice and is joined here by the River Teise (Lesser Teise) and both pass under Twyford Bridge. The river then flows in a loop towards the village where it is joined by the River Beult which has passed under Town Bridge. However the main stream of the River Teise flowed into the Beult near Benover, 3 km upstream of Town Bridge. Twyford Bridge is not navigable. Twyford bridge is 16 km from Allington, where the Medway becomes tidal. The medieval Town Bridge is built of ragstone in the 15th century, it has seven arches and spans the Beult and the marshy ground each side. It is reputed to be the longest existing medieval bridge in Kent being 150m in length.

Floods
Parts of Yalding that have flooded before are, e.g.:
 Christmas Day 1927
eight times in the winter of 2000–1. 
 in December 2013

Transport
Yalding village and environs are primarily served by Nu-Venture buses 23 and 26.

Yalding railway station lies on the Medway Valley Line which links Strood, Maidstone West, Yalding, Paddock Wood and Tonbridge.

Education
The village primary school is St Peter's and St Paul's Church of England Primary School. At secondary level, the school is in the Mascalls Academy Comprehensive catchment area. However, the village is home to many children who attend grammar schools in the neighbouring town of Maidstone.

Leisure
Yalding has a cricket club whose first recorded game was in 1798. The cricket pitch was once beside the River Medway on the Lees (Village Common). They currently play on the Kintons ground.

The Greensand Way long-distance footpath crosses the Medway at Twyford Bridge, and follows up the High Street, passes through Blunden Lane, and leaves the village by an ancient byway by Bustom Farm Cottages. The Medway Valley Walk follows the river from Tonbridge to the sluice on the east bank, then the Hampstead Lane Canal, and the river to Maidstone on the west bank.

Yalding Organic Garden has a display of fourteen individual gardens, demonstrating gardening through the last 800 years. The plants have been carefully chosen to make sure that they are accurate to their historical period.

Yalding has a popular annual contemporary music festival called 'The Vicar's Picnic', set on the edge of the village. Taking place every July it attracts up to 4000 visitors who camp in adjoining fields. Notable acts that have recently performed include The Fun Lovin' Criminals, Starsailor, Reef, Norman Jay MBE, Seb Fontaine, Bruce Foxton, Nightmares on Wax, 90's Indie Britpop band Cast, Canterbury folk-hiphop act, 'Coco & the Butterfields' and The Bluetones lead vocalist Mark Morriss. The festival is taking a break in 2019, returning in 2020.

The Yalding and District Beekeepers Association was formed in January 2011, by a group of local beekeepers, and meets monthly in the Chequers Inn, Laddingford.

There is a football club, formed in 2011 – Yalding and Laddingford FC based at the Kintons ground and the Jubilee field Laddingford with teams in the Maidstone and Mid Kent Sunday League. The  teams are in Div 1 and 3.  In 2012 club formed a side to play in the Tonbridge Saturday league . A new junior section of under 10's and under 13's was formed in 2013.
In April 2014 the Saturday side won the club's first major silverware by winning the Chairman's cup at Longmead Stadium and the following week the Sunday reserve side became league winners. Following this season the club was accepted into the Kent County League in division 3 East. The club has a junior section with 7 teams playing between the ages of 6 and 18. At present the club have 1 sides at u7  1 at u8, one each at u10, ,2 at u11, 1 at u13 and 1 at u14 a junior futsal side and an u18 side.

Notable people
Edmund Blunden, (1896-1974), Great War poet, lived in Yalding during the first decade of the twentieth century and the village inspired more than fifty of his poems.
Barry Evans, (1943–1997), actor best known for the sitcoms Doctor In The House and Mind Your Language, lived in Yalding for a short time.
David Sadler, (b. 1946), football player, was born in Yalding.

References

External links
 Yalding Parish Council 

 Notes on Yalding
 Yalding parish church
 photos of Yalding and surrounding area on geograph

Villages in Kent
Civil parishes in Kent